Worksop is a market town in the Bassetlaw District of Nottinghamshire, England.  The town contains over 100 listed buildings that are recorded in the National Heritage List for England.  Of these, four are listed at Grade I, the highest of the three grades, five are at Grade II*, the middle grade, and the others are at Grade II, the lowest grade.  The most important listed buildings are a former priory, later a parish church, the gatehouse to the priory, a lodge, and a country house, which are listed at Grade I, and structures associated with them are also listed.  Most of the other listed buildings include houses, cottages and associated structures, shops, offices, farmhouses and farm buildings, public houses and hotels, public buildings and churches.  The rest of the listed buildings include a market cross,  a canal lock, schools, a bank, a railway station and a signal box, a pumping station, war memorials and a telephone kiosk.


Key

Buildings

References

Citations

Sources

 

Lists of listed buildings in Nottinghamshire
L